Park Jin  (born 16 September 1956) is a South Korean diplomat and politician. He is the 16th, 17th, 18th, and 21st National Assembly (South Korea) members and the 40th Foreign Minister.

Life
Park Jin passed the 11th Foreign Affairs Examination in 1977 and served as a Ministry of Foreign Affairs (South Korea) Officer in 1978. From 1980 to 1983, he served as a naval officer through a course of naval cadets. He was selected for the seventh term of state-funded international studies in 1983 and earned a master's degree in public administration at Harvard Kennedy School in 1985 and a Ph.D. in political science at Oxford University in 1993.

Since 1993, he has served as an overseas press secretary and political secretary at the presidential secretariat of the Kim Young-sam administration. Since 2002, he has served as the 16th and 17th lawmakers of Jongno-gu, Seoul, and served as the chairman of the National Assembly's Foreign Affairs and Trade Committee, taking the lead in ratifying the United States-Korea Free Trade Agreement and passing the North Korean Human Rights Act.

In 2008, he visited the United States as the head of the Korea-U.S. Congressional Diplomatic Association and met Joe Biden, the chairman of the Senate Foreign Relations Committee.

In 2020, he moved to Gangnam-gu B, Seoul, and was elected to the 21st National Assembly (South Korea).

In May 2022, he was appointed Foreign Minister of the Yoon Suk-yeol government.

Career

 May 2022 Minister of Foreign Affairs(Ministry of Foreign Affairs (South Korea))
 Apr. 2022 Head of the ROK-US Policy Consultation Delegation, 20th Presidential Transition Committee
 Jan. 2022~ Mar. 2022 Chairman of the Global Vision Committee, 20th Presidential Election Headquarters, People Power Party (South Korea)
 Sep. 2020~Co- President of the Parliamentary Diplomacy Forum on the United States, 21st National Assembly (South Korea)
 Jul. 2020~Co- Chairman of the Future Policy Research Association, 21st National Assembly (South Korea)
 Jul. 2020~ Chairman of the Global Diplomacy and Security Forum, 21st National Assembly (South Korea)
 Jul. 2020 Member, Foreign Affairs and Unification Committee, 21st National Assembly (South Korea)
 Jun. 2020 Chairman of the Special Committee on Diplomacy & Security, People Power Party (South Korea)
 May 2020~ Member of the 21st National Assembly (South Korea) (Gangnam 2nd District)
 Feb. 2017~Feb. 2020 Chairman, Korea-America Association
 2014~ Global Fellow, Woodrow Wilson International Center for Scholars
 Mar. 2013~May 2020 Endowed Chair Professor, Graduate School of International and Area Studies, Hankuk University of Foreign Studies
 Aug. 2008~Aug. 2010 Chairman, Foreign Affairs, Trade, and Unification Committee, 18th National Assembly (South Korea)
 May 2008~May 2012 Member of the 18th National Assembly (South Korea) (Jongno District)
 Dec. 2007~Feb. 2008 Head of the Foreign Affairs, Unification, and Security Subcommittee,17th Presidential Transition Committee
 Sep. 2007~Jun. 2008 Chairman of the International Committee, Grand National Party
 Jul. 2004~Feb. 2005 Chairman of the International Committee, Grand National Party
 May 2004~May 2008 Member of the 17th National Assembly (South Korea) (Jongno District)
 2004~2017 President, Korea Britain Society
 Aug. 2002~May 2004 Member of the 16th National Assembly (South Korea) (Jongno District)
 Mar. 1999~Feb. 2002 Research Professor, Institute of East and West Studies, Yonsei University
 Jul. 1996~Mar. 1998 Presidential Secretary for Political Affairs, Office of the President
 May 1993~ Jul. 1996 Presidential Press Secretary, Office of the President
 1990~1993 Lecturer in Politics, University of Newcastle upon Tyne
 1989~1990 MacArthur Foundation Fellow, King's College London
 1987~1988 Japan Foundation Fellow, University of Tokyo, Komaba Campus
 Nov. 1977~Mar. 1978 Ministry of Foreign Affairs (South Korea)
 Aug. 1977 Passed the Foreign Service Examination

References

1956 births
Living people
People from Seoul
Seoul National University School of Law alumni
Harvard Kennedy School alumni
Alumni of St Antony's College, Oxford
New York University School of Law alumni
Members of the National Assembly (South Korea)
People Power Party (South Korea) politicians
South Korean diplomats
Foreign ministers of South Korea
Academics of Newcastle University
Academic staff of Hankuk University of Foreign Studies
Republic of Korea Navy personnel
Honorary Commanders of the Order of the British Empire